German emigration to France has resulted in it being the home of one of the largest communities of German population born outside Germany.
Migration from Germany to France has increased rapidly from the 1990s onwards, and by 2012 there were an estimated 130,000 German citizens living in France.

See also
 German diaspora

External links
 Website Franco-German
 Information on Germany by the French Ministry of Europe and Foreign Affairs

References 

France
European diaspora in France
German diaspora in Europe